Burleigh, also known as the McGehee-Phifer Plantation, is a historic plantation house located near Concord, Person County, North Carolina.  It was built between about 1800 and 1820, and is a -story, vernacular Late Georgian central hall plan symmetrical frame dwelling.  The front and facades features Greek Revival style, one-story, temple front porticoes with Doric order columns.  The interior has Late Federal and Greek Revival style design elements.

The house was added to the National Register of Historic Places in 1980.

References

Plantation houses in North Carolina
Houses on the National Register of Historic Places in North Carolina
Greek Revival houses in North Carolina
Federal architecture in North Carolina
Georgian architecture in North Carolina
Houses completed in 1820
Houses in Person County, North Carolina
National Register of Historic Places in Person County, North Carolina